Mata Sahib Devan (1 November 1681 – 1747) was the wife of Guru Gobind Singh. She was the daughter of Har Bhagwan Devan (alias Ramu), a Bassi Khatri of Rohtas, Jhelum District. 
Mata Sahib Devan was born on 1 November 1681 at Rohtas. She was offered to be a bride of Guru Gobind Singh by her father Bhai Rama, a devout Nanak Naam Leva Sikh, and the nuptials took place on 15 April 1700 at Anandpur.

She is mother of whole Khalsa Panth, when a Sikh becomes amritdhari (baptized), Guru Gobind Singh Ji is their father and Mata Sahib Devan Ji is their mother.

Marriage proposal
When the proposal was brought for discussion to Anandpur, the Guru at first refused, as he was married already and had four sons.  The Sangat and the Guru's family agreed to the marriage, but Guru Gobind Singh, the tenth Guru made it clear that his relationship with Mata Sahib Devan would be of a spiritual nature and not physical.

The Guru proclaimed her to be the Mother of the Khalsa and since then novitiates have been declared to be the sons and daughters of Gurū Gobind Siṅgh and Mātā Sāhib Devāṅ.

During the battle of Anandpur Mata Sahib Devan was split from the holy family of the tenth Guru during the siege of Fort Kesgarh where, along with Mata Sunderi, she was escorted to safety to Sri Damdama Sahib by Bhai Sahib Bhai Mani Singh Shaheed.

Mata Sahib Devan accompanied Guru Gobind Singh to Delhi and then on to Nanded whilst Mata Sunderi stayed back in Delhi.

It was in Nanded that Guru Gobind Singh informed Mata Sahib Devan of his time to leave Earth for his heavenly abode at which he commanded her to leave for Delhi to be with Mata Sunderi Ji. The Guru gave Mata Sahib Devan 5 weapons of Guru Hargobind Sahib the sixth Guru, as his reminder and his Insignia (with which she issued 9 Hukamname or Letters of Command for the Khalsa). Mata Sahib Devan resided in Delhi with Mata Sunderi Ji and lived a life of Naam Simran (Waheguru Naam Meditation) and Seva (selfless service) for the Khalsa Panth.

Mata Sahib Devan left in 1747 at the age of 66 and was cremated at Gurdwara Bala Sahib, New Delhi. Her memorial stands close to the one commemorating Mata Sunderi Ji.

Presence during Amrit Sanchaar
There are different views among Sikh historians on her presence during this event. According to Bhai Kahn Singh Nabha in the Mahan Kosh, Mata Sahib Devan was present during the creation of Khalsa Panth and participated in making Pahul by adding sugar wafers but the Twarikh Guru Khalsa refutes this claim.
The Twarikh states that Guru Gobind Singh's first wife, Mata Jito, put sugar wafers in the Pahul and that Mata Sahib Devan was not married to Guru Gobind Singh at that time.

In popular culture 
Supreme Motherhood: The Journey of Mata Sahib Kaur, a 2022 computer-animated film by Nihal Nihal Nihal Productions & Zee Studios, depicts the life of Mata Sahib Kaur, from a young girl to becoming the "Mother of the Khalsa".

See also
 Mata Jito
 Mata Sundari

References

Indian Sikhs
Family members of the Sikh gurus
Kaur, Mata Devan
History of Punjab
Sikhism and women
Punjabi women
1681 births
1747 deaths